Louis-Eugène-Georges Hautecœur (11 June 1884, Paris - 17 November 1973, Paris) was a French art historian and museum conservator.

Biography 
He was born to Alfred Albert Hautecœur and his wife, Jeanne née Barrault, who were print merchants. After attending the Lycée Henri-IV, he was admitted to the École Normale Supérieure in 1905, and passed his exam for becoming an agrégé in 1908. He was with the École française de Rome from then until 1910, during which time he was in charge of excavations in Tunisia, under the aegis of the Académie des Inscriptions et Belles Lettres. In 1909, he married his first wife, Marcelle Charlotte Poullain. 

From 1910 until the start of World War I, he held several teaching positions, in Paris, Laon and Amiens. He was awarded a Doctorate in 1912, and was mobilized in 1914, serving as a Second-Lieutenant in the 152nd Infantry Division. In 1917, he was attached to the Ministry of War and became head of the Diplomatic Information Service in Lugano.

After the war, he was a professor of art history at the Université de Caen (1919-1931) and the École du Louvre (1920-1940). He also held the Chair of Architectural History at the École des Beaux-Arts (1920-1940). At the same time, he served in administrative positions; notably at the Louvre (1919-1927), and as the last conservator of the original Musée du Luxembourg (1927-1937). He hlso helped to organize its successor, the Musée National d’Art Moderne at the Palais de Tokyo; serving as its director until 1940. As a result of these activities, he was made a Knight in the Legion of Honor in 1938.

In July 1940, he was named Directeur Général des Beaux-Arts; replacing , who was highly critical of the new Vichy government. From March 1941, he was Scrétaire Général des Beaux-Arts and Conseiller d'État. During his tenure, he was presented with the Ordre de la Francisque. Nevertheless, in early 1944, he was removed by order of Hermann Göring, for "refusal to collaborate", and he became director of studies at the École Pratique des Hautes Etudes.

Following the Liberation, he was reinstated as Secrétaire Général. He joined the Association for the Defence of the Memory of Marshal Pétain in 1951. The following year, he became a member of the Institut de France and was elected to the Académie des Beaux-Arts, where he took Seat #6 in the "Unattached" section. A widower, he married his second wife, the paleographer Marguerite Milliez (1918-2001), in 1956.

References

Further reading 
 C. Poulain : L'action de Louis Hautecœur au secrétariat général des Beaux-arts (1940-1944). La permanence des beaux-arts dans la fracture de Vichy], doctoral thesis, École nationale des chartes, 2001 (online)
 Antonio Brucculeri : Du dessein historique à l'action publique. Louis Hautecœur et l'architecture classique en France, Paris, éd. Picard, 2007

External links 
 Antonio Brucculeri, "Louis Hautecœur : repères biographiques", from: Louis Hautecœur et la tradition classique @ OpenEditions
 Biographies and references @ AGORHA (Institut national d'histoire de l'art)



1884 births
1973 deaths
French art historians
French curators
Recipients of the Legion of Honour
Members of the Académie des beaux-arts
People from Paris